The Coast Is Clear is the debut album by Canadian indie rock band In-Flight Safety, released on January 24, 2006 on Dead Daisy Records and distributed by Outside Music.  The album was recognized by the music industry, with the group winning three awards at the 2006 Nova Scotia Music Awards, including Album of the Year. In 2007, they won three East Coast Music Awards, including Group Recording of the Year for this album.  The music video for "Coast Is Clear" was nominated for Video of the Year at the 2007 Juno Awards.  Lead vocalist and guitarist John Mullane wrote the lyrics for each song.

Recording
Recorded at a number of studios in Vancouver and Halifax, the album was self-produced by the band.  Drums on tracks 1, 2, 7, 9, and 10 were recorded by Laurence Currie at Sonic Temple Studio, Halifax, Nova Scotia, Canada.  The assistant engineer was Darren van Niekerk.  Bass was recorded by Currie at Idea of East, Halifax, Nova Scotia, Canada with Craig Sperry as assistant engineer.  Technical support was provided by Michael Ryan.

Pre-production for the remainder of the album was done by Wayne Livesey at The Rockspace, former home to Little Mountain Sound Studios, Vancouver, British Columbia, Canada.  Drums and bass were recorded by Livesey at Mushroom Studios, Vancouver, British Columbia, Canada.  Additional recording (also by Livesey) was done at The Shed, Vancouver, British Columbia, Canada.  The second engineer was Joel Livesey.

Packaging
Album design was done by In-Flight Safety.  The painting of the girl (on the reverse side) is by Andrzej Michael Karwacki.  Karen Baer provided the band photo on the inside sleeve.

Track listing
All lyrics by John Mullane.  Music written by In-Flight Safety except as noted.
 "Coast Is Clear"  
 "Time & Place"
 "Surround" (In-Flight Safety, Jon Sheen)
 "A Lot to Learn" (In-Flight Safety, Sheen)
 "Letting Go"
 "Turn Me Around"
 "Fear"
 "The World Won't"
 "Silent Treatment"
 "Lost (The March Song)"

Personnel
 In-Flight Safety:
 Brad Goodsell – bass, gang vocals
 Daniel Ledwell – piano, organ, Mellotron, glockenspiel, backing vocals
 John Mullane – vocals, guitars, glockenspiel
 Glen Nicholson – drums, gang vocals
Guest musicians:
 Jon Sheen – Rhodes, mellotron
 Jill Barber – additional vocals
 Rose Cousins – additional vocals
 Jenn Grant – additional vocals
Production:
 Joa Carvalho - mastering 
 John Mullane,  In-Flight Safety - Mixing
 Daniel Ledwell, John Mullane - overdub recording at Northern Electron Studios, Halifax, Nova Scotia, Canada
 Karen Baer - band photo inside sleeve

References

External links
 In-Flight Safety official website

2006 albums
In-Flight Safety albums